Western Harbour is a mainly residential development in Newhaven, Scotland. The new urbanist masterplan is designed by the new classical office of ADAM Architecture.

Reaching north into the Firth of Forth away from Newhaven Harbour, the site extends the breakwater on the west side of the Port of Leith with land reclaimed from the waters of the harbour through landfill. On the opposite side of the port to Ocean Terminal, Western Harbour forms part of a major redevelopment of the area.

History
In 2003, it was the location for the 2003 MTV Europe Music Awards. The awards ceremony was held in a 6,000 capacity big top arena constructed specifically for the main event.

In 2004 the owner of the Docks, Forth Ports, announced plans to close the port and carry out a major redevelopment of the area. The planned development, which was given supplementary planning guidance by the City of Edinburgh Council in 2004, will be the size of a small town with up to 17,000 new homes.

Three large blocks of flats have already been completed, with the whole development set to be finalised around 2020.

References

External links

 Masterplan at Western Harbour - ADAM Architecture UK
 Edinburgh Forthside

Areas of Edinburgh
Buildings and structures in Leith
Redeveloped ports and waterfronts in Scotland
New Urbanism communities